Elisa Maria Di Lazzaro (born 5 June 1998) is an Italian hurdler, who participated at the 2018 World Indoor Championships in Athletics. She competed at the 2020 Summer Olympics, in 100 m hurdles.

Personal bests
 60 metres hurdles indoor: 8.12 (Toruń, Poland, 7 March 2021)
 100 metres hurdles: 12.90 (Savona, Italy, 13 May 2021)

Achievements

National titles
She has won four national championships at individual senior level.

Italian Athletics Championships
100 metres hurdles: 2022

Italian Athletics Indoor Championships
60 metres hurdles: 2017, 2021, 2022

See also
 Italian all-time lists - 100 metres hurdles
 Italy at the IAAF World Indoor Championships

References

External links
 

1998 births
Italian female hurdlers
Athletics competitors of Centro Sportivo Carabinieri
Living people
Sportspeople from Trieste
Italian Athletics Championships winners
Athletes (track and field) at the 2020 Summer Olympics
Olympic athletes of Italy